The Minister of the Interior and Kingdom Relations is the head of the Ministry of the Interior and Kingdom Relations and a member of the Cabinet and the Council of Ministers and dual serves as the Minister of the Interior. The current Minister is Hanke Bruins Slot of the Christian Democratic Appeal (CDA) party who has been in office since 10 January 2022. ​Regularly a State Secretary is assigned to the Ministry who is tasked with specific portfolios. The current State Secretary is Alexandra van Huffelen of the Democrats 66 (D66) party who also has been in office since 10 January 2022 and has been assigned the portfolios of Kingdom Relations, Local Government and Digital Government.

List of Ministers of Colonial Affairs (1866–1946)
For full list, see List of Ministers of Kingdom Relations of the Netherlands.

List of Ministers of Colonial Affairs (1946–1959)

List of Ministers of Kingdom Relations (since 1959)

List of Ministers without Portfolio

List of State Secretaries

See also
 Ministry of the Interior and Kingdom Relations
 List of Ministers of the Interior

References

Kingdom Relations